Events from the year 1326 in the Kingdom of Scotland.

Incumbents
Monarch – Robert I

Events
 April 1326 – Robert the Bruce renews the Auld Alliance by signing the Treaty of Corbeil.

See also

 Timeline of Scottish history

References

 
Years of the 14th century in Scotland
Wars of Scottish Independence